Bala Velayat Rural District is a rural district (dehestan) in Bala Velayat District, Bakharz County, Razavi Khorasan Province, Iran. At the 2006 census, its population was 17,145, in 3,723 families.  The rural district has 25 villages.

References 

Rural Districts of Razavi Khorasan Province
Bakharz County